Ivan Quaranta (born 14 December 1974) is an Italian former professional road bicycle racer, who currently works as a directeur sportif for UCI Continental team . During his career, he won six stages at the Giro d'Italia, between 1999 and 2001.

Career
Born in Crema, Lombardy, Quaranta's most successful year was 1999, when he was riding for the  team; he already had five wins to his credit leading up to the Giro d'Italia. He then won the first stage in a sprint finish, ahead of Mario Cipollini, significantly boosting his profile.

Saeco dropped Quaranta after a single season, subsequent to which he had negligible success. His final win was in the 2007 Settimana Ciclistica Lombarda.

Quaranta retired from professional cycling after the 2008 season.

Major results

1997
 3rd Rund um die Nürnberger Altstadt
 10th Overall Giro di Puglia
1998
 1st Stage 1 Tour de Normandie
 1st Stage 4 Olympia's Tour
 Tour de Serbie
1st Stages 1 & 7
1999
 Giro d'Italia
1st Stages 1 & 11
 1st Stage 2 Three Days of De Panne
 1st Stage 1 Settimana Ciclistica Lombarda
 1st Stage 3 Giro d'Abruzzo
 7th Grand Prix Pino Cerami
2000
 Giro d'Italia
1st Stages 1 & 10
 Tour de Langkawi
1st Stages 7, 8 & 11
 1st Stage 3 Settimana Ciclistica Lombarda
 2nd Memorial Fabio Casartelli
2001
 Giro d'Italia
1st Stages 5 & 16
 1st Stage 7 Tour de Langkawi
 1st Stage 1 Settimana Internazionale di Coppi e Bartali
 1st Stage 3 Tour of the Netherlands
2002
 1st Dwars door Gendringen
 1st Stage 1 Tour of Qatar
 1st Stage 5 Tour of Sweden
 1st Stage 2a Regio-Tour
 2nd Gran Premio Nobili Rubinetterie
2003
 1st Stage 4 Tour of Qatar
 1st Stage 3 Settimana Internazionale di Coppi e Bartali
 1st Stage 4 Deutschland Tour
 1st Stage 1 Brixia Tour
2004
 1st Stage 6 Tour de Langkawi
 1st Stage 3 Settimana Ciclistica Lombarda
 9th Giro della Provincia di Reggio Calabria
2007
 1st Stage 4 Settimana Ciclistica Lombarda

Grand Tour general classification results timeline

References

External links

Living people
1974 births
Italian Giro d'Italia stage winners
Italian male cyclists
Cyclists from the Province of Cremona